Wren High School (WHS) is a public high school in Anderson School District One in Anderson County, South Carolina, United States. It is accredited by the Southern Association of Colleges and Schools.

Athletics

State championships 
 Basketball - Girls: 1967
 Competitive Cheer: 1997, 2021
 Football: 2019
 Golf - Girls: 2011
 Softball: 2008
 Track - Boys: 2003, 2020, 2021

Notable alumni
Bryce McGowens (2018), shooting guard for the Charlotte Hornets 
 Kelly Bryant (2015), quarterback for the Toronto Argonauts of the Canadian Football League
 Shannon Faulkner (1993), first female cadet to enter the Citadel
 Kyle Fisher (2012), MLS professional soccer player 
 D.J. Jones (2014), defensive tackle for the San Francisco 49ers
 Wes Knight (2004), MLS professional soccer player
 Wesley Quinn (2008), former member of the musical group V Factory

References

External links
 Wren High School official website
 Anderson School District One

Public high schools in South Carolina
Educational institutions established in 1957
Schools in Anderson County, South Carolina
1957 establishments in South Carolina